Kedar Prasad Chalise is a Nepalese judge. He is currently a justice of the Supreme Court of Nepal.

See also
 Deepak Raj Joshee
 Gopal Prasad Parajuli

References

External links
 Supreme Court of Nepal

Living people
Justices of the Supreme Court of Nepal
1954 births
Nepalese Hindus